The 1972 Tour of the Basque Country was the 12th edition of the Tour of the Basque Country cycle race and was held from 19 April to 23 April 1972. The race started and finished in Eibar. The race was won by José Antonio González Linares of the Kas team.

General classification

References

1972
Bas